Bartang may refer to:
 Bartang, a river in Tajikistan and Afghanistan
 Bartang Valley in Gorno-Badakhshan Autonomous Province
 Bartang (jamoat) one of the jamoats of Tajikistan